The 2018 NCAA Division III men's basketball tournament was the 44th annual single-elimination tournament to determine the national champion of men's NCAA Division III college basketball in the United States. Featuring sixty-four teams, it began on March 2, 2018, following the 2017–18 season, and concluded with the championship game on March 17, 2018.

Once again, the national semifinal and championship rounds were held at the Salem Civic Center in Salem, Virginia.

Nebraska Wesleyan defeated Wisconsin–Oshkosh in the final, 78–72, to win their first national title. Cooper Cook was voted the MVP.

Qualifying teams

Automatic bids (43)

The following 43 teams were automatic qualifiers for the 2018 NCAA field by virtue of winning their conference's automatic bid (except for the UAA, whose regular-season champion received the automatic bid).

At-large bids (21)

The following 21 teams were awarded qualification for the 2018 NCAA field by the NCAA Division III Men's Basketball Committee. The committee evaluated teams on the basis of their win-loss percentage, strength of schedule, head-to-head results, results against common opponents, and results against teams included in the NCAA's final regional rankings.

Tournament bracket

Top-left – Mahwah, New Jersey

Bottom-left – Rock Island, Illinois

Top-right – Platteville, Wisconsin

Bottom-right – Swarthmore, Pennsylvania

Final Four

See also
 2018 NCAA Division I men's basketball tournament
 2018 NCAA Division II men's basketball tournament
 2018 NCAA Division I women's basketball tournament
 2018 National Invitation Tournament
 2018 Women's National Invitation Tournament
 2018 NAIA Division I men's basketball tournament
 2018 NAIA Division II men's basketball tournament
 2018 NAIA Division I women's basketball tournament

References

NCAA Division III men's basketball tournament
Ncaa Tournament
NCAA Division III Men's Basketball